Red Island (or Red Hill) is a lava dome volcano in the Salton Trough, and part of the Salton Buttes, the only active volcanoes in Southern California. It is located in Imperial County, California. It contains two lava domes, Prospect Dome and Alamo Dome. The domes have been dormant for 2,000 to 8,000 years.

References

External links
Imperial County PDS website for park

Volcanoes of California
Lava domes
Volcanoes of Imperial County, California